Yinon Yahel (born August 26, 1978), is an Israeli multi-instrumentalist, music producer, DJ, and remixer. He produced the Israeli 'Song of the Year' in 2015 and 2017 and was awarded 'Arranger of the Year' in 2015.

Career

1993–1996: Eman
Yahel began his career at the age of 14 as the keyboardist for the Israeli teen rock group Eman, which in 1993 became the youngest group to sign a major record deal in Israel.

Club DJ career
Following the breakup of Eman, Yahel focused his attention toward the electronic music scene and began to perform live at dance clubs.

2002–2005 Beginning of collaboration with Offer Nissim and Maya
In 2002, Yahel met Maya Simantov, also known as "Maya", and they began working together. After introducing Maya to world-renowned Israeli DJ Offer Nissim, the trio embarked on a collaboration. In 2005, they released their debut album, First Time (DJ Offer Nissim ft. Maya), on Star 69 Records.

The international release proved a major success. Three singles from the album made their way up the Billboard Dance/Club Play chart, including "First Time" (top 10), "Searching" (top 20), and "That's the Way I Like It" (top 20). In the following years, the trio released several more albums: Searching, Forever Tel Aviv, Happy People: Summer Edition, Pride All Over, and Over You.

2006–2008 Official remixes for Kristine W, Deborah Cox, and Beyoncé
By 2006, Yahel had expanded his reach globally throughout the dance community and began receiving remix assignments for established artists. During this period, together with Offer Nissim, he released several official remix hits such as Kristine W's "Wonder of It All", Deborah Cooper's "Love You All Over", Amuka's "I Want More", and Deborah Cox's "Easy as Life". The two also officially remixed Beyoncé's "One Night Only" and "Deja Vu", and Suzanne Palmer's "Home" and "Fascinated", which subsequently reached Top 10 in the US.

In 2008, Yahel released the first single under his own name, "Shine", which was co-written with Canadian singer Jesse LaBelle. LaBelle was also the vocalist on the track, which topped the official dance music chart in Mexico.

2008–2009 MTV's Making the Band and work for Madonna, Jennifer Lopez, and P. Diddy
Later in 2008, Yahel teamed up with singer-songwriter and multi-platinum music producer Marcus Vest, better known by his stage name Channel 7, to collaborate as music producers on P. Diddy's MTV reality show Making the Band 4. During the show, the two produced singles for major R&B artists Danity Kane, a female music group, and Donnie Klang, the show's eventual winner. Together with Klang and R&B rising star Jason Derulo, Yahel and Channel 7 wrote and produced the song "Dr Love", which later appeared on the original soundtrack of the motion picture Aliens in the Attic. Through this period of time, Yahel also remixed and produced songs for Madonna, Jennifer Lopez, Cassie, and P. Diddy.

Furthermore, in 2008, Yahel and Vest wrote and produced the title track for multi-platinum recording artist and singer Ashanti's album The Declaration, which reached number 6 in the US charts. The album received mixed reviews, but the title track was called by some of the critics "the album's 'Diamond in the Rough'". Through his work on Making the Band 4, Yahel also met and worked together with other prominent music producers and musicians such as David Cabrera, Ricky Martin's musical director, and Jim Beanz, a singer and record producer.

2010–2012 Christina Aguilera remix
In 2010, Yahel released the official remix for Christina Aguilera's "You Lost Me", which subsequently topped the Billboard dance chart. He also released the mix compilation White Is Pure 9, an official compilation of Montreal's 2010 White Party Week.

In 2010, Yahel collaborated with Israeli singer Kobi Peretz, remixing his hit song "Baleylot". The two also collaborated in a performance at Gany – Ha'taarucha in Tel Aviv.

2014–2015 Lorena Simpson, Madonna remix, and "Golden Boy" for Eurovision
In 2014, Yahel released two tracks with Brazilian singer-songwriter Lorena Simpson. The track "This Moment" was nominated for Song of the Year on popular Brazilian website DNA da Balada. Their next release, "Worth the Pain", reached #1 on the iTunes Brazil Electronic charts. That same year, Yahel's official remix of "Free People" by Tony Moran ft. Martha Wash reached the #1 spot on Billboard dance, Club & Play. He was also involved yet again with Offer Nissim and Maya Simantov on the hit song "Everybody Needs a Man".

Also in 2014, Yahel produced the song "Revolution of Happiness", a collaboration between Lior Narkis and Omer Adam. The track garnered over 30 million views and reached the #1 spot on the Israeli National charts.

The same year, he wrote and produced the track "Love Song for You" for the Supergroup Project. The tune garnered more than 4 million views on YouTube.

In 2015, Yahel collaborated again with Offer Nissim to deliver the remix for Madonna's track  "Living for Love"  from her album Rebel Heart. The remix climbed to #1 on the Dance Club Billboard US chart.

Also in 2015, Yahel co-wrote the Israeli entry for the Eurovision Song Contest. "Golden Boy", performed by Nadav Guedj, garnered over 30 million YouTube views and reached #1 on the Israeli national chart. He was also involved in the Greek version of the song, titled "Στο θεό με πάει" (Take Me to God) by Eleni Foureira, who also performed the track at the 2015 MAD Video Music Awards. Additionally, Yahel produced the track "Buoy", which was featured on the compilation album Dim Mak Greatest Hits 2015: Originals.

Yahel was also involved in producing the breakout hit "Queen of Roses" (מלכת השושנים) for Israeli singer Eden Ben Zaken.

Between 2011 and 2015, Yahel produced, arranged, and composed the songs for the Israeli children's musical show Festigal.

From 2012 to 2014, Yahel played the keyboards in and did sequencing for The Voice Israel house band.

2016 - Pet Shop Boys and Hardwerk feat. Akon and Sia support show
In 2016, Yahel and Offer Nissim where at the helm of the official remix for the Pet Shop Boys tracks "Say It to Me" and "The Pop Kids" from the British synth-pop duo's album Super. That same summer, Yahel also produced the official remix of the DJ Hardwerk track "Tell Me We're OK", featuring Akon.

Yahel also wrote the debut single for Palestinian singer Lina Makhul, titled "This Ain't About You", which was released worldwide on 29 April 2016.

In August 2016, Yahel produced the live show for Marina Maxmilian's support slot for Sia's debut Israeli performance at Yarkon Park in Tel Aviv.

In 2017, Yahel undertook the live production of the sold-out Israeli show of popular performer Moshe Peretz. His song "Karamela" (produced and arranged by Yahel) was the second-most-played song in Israel in 2017.

Later that year, Yahel was reunited with Nadav Guedj for the single "Maybe We'll Talk" (אולי נדבר), which was #1 on the official Glglz charts, #1 on the Israeli iTunes chart, and in the top 10 most-played songs by ACUM for 2017/2018 (תשע״ח).

2018–present
Yahel's hit single "Sweat" appears on the soundtrack for the French film Sauvage, which was nominated for three awards at the Cannes Film Festival.

In 2019, Yahel produced and co-wrote "Beautiful" by Dutch electro house DJ Moti, Jetfire, and Lovespeake. In the same year, Yahel produced the song "Beg", a duet between NETTA and Omer Adam. The song reached no. 1 in the charts. He also produced an official remix for the single "Wanted" by NOTD featuring Daya.

In 2020, Yahel produced "Feker Libi", Israel's entry to the Eurovision Song Contest.

He also produced the theme song to the children's reality show Boys & Girls.

In the same year, Yahel produced a campaign against violence featuring Israeli rising star Anna Zak. Another single produced by Yahel in 2020 was Ella-Lee's "Ma Ata Rotse?".

In 2021, Yahel introduced new collaborations, such as Roni Dalumi's single "It Comes to Me", Maor Edri & Shefita's single "Halik", Shiri Maimon's hit "Tipa", Eden Ben Zaken's "Yom Hafuch", and the first single from Narkis' third album, "Holechet Itcha".

Partial discography
Albums
 Shine Remixes (2009)
 מצב טיסה feat. Roni "Dani Din" Levi (2012)
 Colors - Yinon Yahel & Meital De Razon (2015)
 Sweat (Original & Remix Pack) (2015)
 Sweat Pt. 2 (2015)
 Bad Boy (Remixes) - Yinon Yahel & Mor Avrahami (2016)
 Night Is Over (feat. Meital De Razon) - Yinon Yahel & Mor Avrahami (2016)
 Don't Wait (The Remixes) - Yinon Yahel & Mor Avrahami (2018)
 Play It Safe (The Remixes) - Yinon Yahel feat. Sapir Amar (2019)
 The One, Pt. 1 (Remixes) - Yinon Yahel & DJ Head (2019)
 The One, Pt. 2 (Remixes) - Yinon Yahel & DJ Head (2019)
 The One, Pt. 3 (Remixes) - Yinon Yahel & DJ Head (2019)
 You & I (The Remixes) - Yinon Yahel feat. Kai (2019)
 Super Life (Remixes) - Yinon Yahel feat. Meital de Razon (2019)
 Not Good for Me (The Remixes) - Yinon Yahel feat. Sailo (2019)

Compilations
 Rock the Beat #001 (2020)
 Rock the Beat #002 (2020)
 Rock the Beat #003 (2020)

References

External links
 

1978 births
Israeli musicians
Living people